The Marta is an Italian river that flows into the Tyrrhenian Sea. Its source is Lake Bolsena near Marta. It flows past Tuscania and is joined by a tributary that flows from the Cimini Hills. It then flows past Tarquinia and enters the Tyrrhenian Sea near Lido di Tarquinia.

References

Rivers of Lazio
Rivers of the Province of Viterbo
Drainage basins of the Tyrrhenian Sea
Rivers of Italy